Earvin N'Gapeth (born 12 February 1991) is a French volleyball player, member of the France national volleyball team and Iranian club Paykan Tehran VC, 2015 European Champion, gold medallist of the World League (2015 and 2017), French Champion (2010), Italian Champion (2016) and Olympic Champion (2020).

Personal life
His father Éric, from Cameroon, is a former volleyball player who represented France in the 1980s. His father named him after Earvin "Magic" Johnson. Growing up, he played youth football alongside current Paris Saint-Germain defender Layvin Kurzawa when the pair lived in Fréjus.

Ngapeth is a model and brand ambassador for Adidas.

Legal issues

In December 2014, he was sentenced to three months suspended imprisonment by the Criminal Court of Montpellier for a fight in a nightclub in the city a few months earlier. In July 2015, he was arrested and heard in an open hearing by the police following the assault of a TGV train ticket inspector in the Paris-Montparnasse train station. In December 2019, he was arrested in Belo Horizonte, Brazil, accused of sexual harassment for slapping a woman's behind without her permission.

Career

Club
In season 2008-09 he debuted into professional volleyball, hired by Tours VB, where he stayed for three seasons and winner Pro A League. In season 2011-12 he was hired in the Italian team of Cuneo Piemonte in Series A1 League, where he remained for two seasons. With the team, he reached the final of the CEV Europe League. N'gapeth in the next year moved to Kuzbass Kemerovo, a  club playing in Super League; however, during the season he abandoned the team and returned to Italy, wearing the shirt of Modena in the Serie A1. With Modena, he won the 2014-15 Italian Cup and the 2015-16  Italian Championship, Italian Cup, and Italian Supercup. In the season 2015-16 he won his second Italian Supercup.
Ngapeth after four years in Modena joined Zenit Kazan with a two-year contract.

National team
On October 7, 2010 he was expelled from the national team on disciplinary grounds during World Championship held in Italy. He came back to national team at European Championship 2011. In 2014 played at World Championship 2014 held in Poland. France lost the match for the bronze medal with Germany and took 4th place. He was one of the key players in the 2015 World League championship campaign. On October 18, 2015 France national team, including N'Gapeth, achieved title of the European Champion 2015 (3–0 with Slovenia in the finale). Ngapeth for the second time in a year 2017, selected Most Valuable Player of FIVB World League and winner gold medalist with France.

Sporting achievements

Clubs

 CEV Champions League
  2012/2013 – with Bre Banca Lannutti Cuneo
  2018/2019 – with Zenit Kazan

 Asian Club Championship
  2022 – with Paykan

 FIVB Club World Championship
  Betim 2019 – with Zenit Kazan

 National championships
 2008/2009  French Cup, with Tours VB
 2009/2010  French Cup, with Tours VB
 2009/2010  French Championship, with Tours VB
 2010/2011  French Cup, with Tours VB
 2014/2015  Italian Cup, with Modena Volley
 2015/2016  Italian SuperCup, with DHL Modena
 2015/2016  Italian Cup, with DHL Modena
 2015/2016  Italian Championship, with DHL Modena
 2016/2017  Italian SuperCup, with DHL Modena

National team 

 2020  Olympic Games

Youth national team
 2007  CEV U19 European Championship
 2008  CEV U20 European Championship
 2009  CEV U19 European Championship

Individual awards
 2008: CEV U20 European Championship – Most Valuable Player
 2009: CEV U19 European Championship – Best Server
 2009: CEV U19 European Championship – Most Valuable Player
 2011: French Championship – Most Valuable Player 
 2011: French Championship – Best Receiver 
 2015: Italian Cup – Most Valuable Player
 2015: FIVB World League – Best Outside Spiker
 2015: FIVB World League – Most Valuable Player
 2015: CEV European Championship – Best Outside Spiker
 2016: Italian Championship – Best Player
 2016: European Confederation Gala – Most Spectacular Player
 2017: FIVB World League – Best Outside Spiker
 2017: FIVB World League – Most Valuable Player
 2021: Olympic Games Tokyo – Most Valuable Player and Best Outside Spiker
 2022: Asian Club Championship – Best Outside Spiker
 2022: FIVB Nations League – Most Valuable Player and Best Outside Spiker

References

External links

 
 Earvin Ngapeth at LegaVolley.it 
 Earvin NGAPETH at LNV.fr
 Earvin N'Gapeth at WorldofVolley.com
 Earvin N'Gapeth at Volleybox.net 
 
 

1991 births
Living people
French sportspeople of Cameroonian descent
People from Saint-Raphaël, Var
French men's volleyball players
Olympic volleyball players of France
Volleyball players at the 2016 Summer Olympics
French expatriate sportspeople in Italy
Expatriate volleyball players in Italy
French expatriate sportspeople in Russia
Expatriate volleyball players in Russia
Modena Volley players
VC Zenit Kazan players
Volleyball players at the 2020 Summer Olympics
Medalists at the 2020 Summer Olympics
Olympic gold medalists for France
Olympic medalists in volleyball
Outside hitters
Tours Volley-Ball players
Sportspeople from Var (department)